Watson Island is an island in the Queen Charlotte Strait region of the Central Coast of British Columbia, Canada, located to the north of North Broughton Island in the entrance to Mackenzie Sound. It is named for Alexander Watson colonial treasurer of Vancouver Island in 1866 and later an official with the original Bank of British Columbia.

See also
List of islands of British Columbia
Watson Island (disambiguation)

References

Islands of British Columbia
Central Coast of British Columbia